The Eisenhower Executive Office Building (EEOB), formerly known as the Old Executive Office Building (OEOB), and originally known as the State, War, and Navy Building, is a United States government building that is part of the White House compound in the U.S. capital of Washington, D.C. Maintained by the General Services Administration, the building currently houses the Executive Office of the President, including the Office of the Vice President of the United States. In 1999, the building was renamed in honor of Dwight D. Eisenhower, the 34th U.S. president and a five-star U.S. Army general who oversaw several military campaigns of the Allied forces during World War II.

Located on 17th Street NW, between Pennsylvania Avenue and State Place and West Executive Drive, the building was commissioned by President Ulysses S. Grant. It was built between 1871 and 1888, on the site of the original 1800 War/State/Navy Building and the White House stables, in the French Second Empire style. 

As its first name suggests, it was initially built to house three departments. While the building's elaborate style received substantial criticism when it was first completed, it has since been designated as a National Historic Landmark.

History

The first executive offices were constructed between 1799 and 1820 on the former site of the Washington Jockey Club, flanking the White House]. In 1869, following the Civil War, Congress appointed a commission to select a site and submit plan and cost estimates for a new State Department Building, with possible arrangements to house the War and Navy departments.

The building, originally called the State, War, and Navy Building because it housed these three departments, was built between 1871 and 1888 in the French Second Empire style.

It was designed by Alfred B. Mullett, Supervising Architect of the Department of Treasury, which had responsibility for federal buildings. Patterned after French Second Empire architecture that clashed sharply with the neoclassical style of the other Federal buildings in the city, it was generally regarded with scorn and disdain. Writer Mark Twain referred to this building as "the ugliest building in America." President Harry S. Truman called it "the greatest monstrosity in America." Historian Henry Adams called it Mullett's “architectural infant asylum.” Mullett later resigned. Beset by financial difficulties, litigation, and illness, in 1890 he committed suicide.

The exterior granite was cut and polished on the island of Vinalhaven, Maine, under a contract with Bodwell Granite Company.  Much of the interior was designed by Richard von Ezdorf, using fireproof cast-iron structural and decorative elements. These included massive skylights above each of the major stairwells, and doorknobs with cast patterns indicating which of the original three occupying departments (State, Navy, or War) occupied a particular space. The total cost to construct the building was $10,038,482 when construction ended in 1888, after 17 years. 

The original tenants quickly outgrew the building and finally vacated it completely in the late 1930s. Becoming known as the Old Executive Office Building, it housed staff members of the Executive Office of the President. The building was considered inefficient and was nearly demolished in 1957. In 1969, the building was designated as a National Historic Landmark.

In 1981, plans began to restore all the "secretary of" suites. The main office of the Secretary of the Navy was restored in 1987 and is now used as the ceremonial office of the vice president. Shortly after September 11, 2001, the 17th Street side of the building was vacated and has since been modernized. The building continues to house various agencies that compose the president's executive office, such as the Office of the Vice President, the Office of Management and Budget, and the National Security Council. Its most public function is that of the Vice President's Ceremonial Office, which is used chiefly for special meetings and press conferences.

Many celebrated national figures have participated in historical events that have taken place within the Old Executive Office Building. Presidents Theodore Roosevelt, William Howard Taft, Franklin D. Roosevelt, Dwight D. Eisenhower, Lyndon B. Johnson, Gerald Ford, and George H. W. Bush all had offices in this building before becoming president. It has housed 16 Secretaries of the Navy, 21 Secretaries of War, and 24 Secretaries of State. Sir Winston Churchill once walked its corridors and Japanese emissaries met there with Secretary of State Cordell Hull after the bombing of Pearl Harbor.

Presidents have occupied space in the EEOB as well. Herbert Hoover worked out of the Secretary of the Navy's office for a few months following a fire in the Oval Office on Christmas Eve 1929. President Dwight D. Eisenhower held the first televised presidential news conference in the building's Indian Treaty Room (Room 474) on January 19, 1955. President Richard Nixon maintained a private "hideaway" office in room 180 of the EEOB during his presidency, from where he preferred to work, using the Oval Office only for ceremonial occasions.

Vice President Lyndon B. Johnson was the first in a succession of vice presidents who have had offices in the building. The first wife of a vice president to have an office in the building was Marilyn Quayle, wife of Dan Quayle, vice president to George H.W. Bush.

The Old Executive Office Building was renamed the Dwight D. Eisenhower Executive Office Building when President Bill Clinton approved legislation changing the name on November 9, 1999. President George W. Bush participated in a rededication ceremony on May 7, 2002.

A small fire on December 19, 2007, damaged an office of the vice-president's staff and included the VP ceremonial office. According to media reporting, the office of the vice president's Political Director, Amy Whitelaw, was heavily damaged in the fire.

Occupants

Presidents
 Theodore Roosevelt – while Assistant Secretary of the Navy
 William Howard Taft – while Secretary of War
 Herbert Hoover – temporary offices after White House fire
 Franklin D. Roosevelt – while Assistant Secretary of the Navy
 Harry S. Truman – offices during reconstruction of the White House
 Dwight D. Eisenhower – while assigned to the Army General Staff
 Lyndon B. Johnson – while Vice President
 Richard Nixon – had "hideaway" office
 Gerald Ford – while Vice President
 George H. W. Bush – while Vice President
 Joe Biden – while Vice President

Vice presidents
Hubert Humphrey
Spiro Agnew
Nelson Rockefeller
Walter Mondale
Dan Quayle
Al Gore
Dick Cheney
Mike Pence
Kamala Harris

Secretaries of State
John Hay
Elihu Root
William Jennings Bryan
Cordell Hull

Secretaries of War
Henry L. Stimson
Russell A. Alger
Newton D. Baker
Patrick J. Hurley

Army chiefs of staff
John Schofield
Nelson A. Miles
John J. Pershing
John L. Hines
Charles Pelot Summerall
Tasker H. Bliss
Peyton C. March
Douglas MacArthur
Malin Craig
George Marshall

Secretaries of the Navy
John Davis Long
Josephus Daniels
Charles Joseph Bonaparte
Charles Francis Adams III
Frank Knox

Senior Navy officers
George Dewey
William S. Benson
William Sims
Ernest King
William D. Leahy
Harold Rainsford Stark
Robert Coontz

Gallery

See also
 Architecture of Washington, D.C.

References

External links

Old Executive Office Building, from the National Park Service
Virtual tour on the White House Web site
General Services Administration page on the Dwight D. Eisenhower Executive Office Building

Government buildings completed in 1888
Office buildings completed in 1888
Buildings of the United States government in Washington, D.C.
National Historic Landmarks in Washington, D.C.
Office buildings on the National Register of Historic Places in Washington, D.C.
Second Empire architecture in Washington, D.C.
Vice presidency of the United States
Alfred B. Mullett buildings
1888 establishments in Washington, D.C.
President's Park